Phonography, meaning "sound writing" in Greek, may refer to:

 The use of a phonograph
 Phonemic orthography
 Pitman shorthand, sometimes called phonography, a system of shorthand stenography developed by Isaac Pitman
 Phonography, a neologism used by some to refer to field recording
 Phonography (album), the 1976 debut album by R. Stevie Moore
 "Phonography", a bonus track on Britney Spears' 2008 album Circus